Radio Peace is the English radio station of the Catholic Archdiocese of Miami.  It is the sister station of the Spanish language Radio Paz.   Radio Peace was founded in 1993.

Radio Peace is broadcast over South Florida & as well as over the Internet 24 hours per day.. 

Christian radio stations in the United States
Catholic radio stations
Radio stations established in 1993
1993 establishments in Florida
Defunct radio stations in the United States
Defunct religious radio stations in the United States